South Swindon is a constituency in the Borough of Swindon, Wiltshire, represented in the House of Commons of the UK Parliament since 2010 by Sir Robert Buckland, a Conservative, who previously served as Justice Secretary and Welsh Secretary.

Boundaries

1997–2010: The Borough of Thamesdown wards of Central, Chiseldon, Dorcan, Eastcott, Freshbrook, Lawns, Park, Ridgeway, Toothill, Walcot, and Wroughton.

2010–present: The Borough of Swindon wards of Central, Dorcan, Eastcott, Freshbrook and Grange Park, Old Town and Lawn, Parks, Ridgeway, Shaw and Nine Elms, Toothill and Westlea, Walcot, and Wroughton and Chiseldon.

The constituency was created in 1997 from parts of the seats of Swindon that was abolished, and Devizes that remains. This seat with a population of around 93,000 incorporates the southern half of the town as well as farms and villages with hamlets to the immediate south and east of Swindon.

It used slightly amended boundaries for the 2010 election, which saw it lose South Marston to North Swindon. The border now runs from Dorcan across to Bishopstone and then down to Russley Park before running west to Barbury Castle. From there it runs north to the Roughmoor area and loops back down to incorporate West Swindon, before following the railway line east through the town and back to Dorcan.  In addition to the south of Swindon, main settlements include Wroughton, Chiseldon, Wanborough and Liddington.

History
Historically Swindon is a railway town and until the latter part of the 20th century the related works were the primary employer. Today Swindon is the home of a number of large companies, examples specific to South Swindon include Intel's European headquarters, Nationwide's headquarters and Zurich Financial Services' UK headquarters.

Members
Created in 1997, the Swindon South constituency, swinging in line with the national average in the New Labour landslide, produced a fairly safe majority for the Labour winner. Julia Drown had a lead of more than 5,000 which was extended in 2001 to more than 7,000 but then dropped dramatically on a new candidate's selection, to just 1,353 in 2005.  In 2010 Robert Buckland, a Conservative, gained South Swindon at the general election with a majority of just over 3500.  In 2015, the Conservative majority increased to 5785; in 2017, the Conservative majority fell to 2,464 on a 3.5% swing to Labour. In 2019, Buckland's majority rose to 6625 (13%) and 52% of the vote with a swing of 4.1% to Conservative. These patterns suggest a seat that is more marginal than its neighbour North Swindon,  and one which has acted as a bellwether of the national result. Incumbent MP Buckland was the Lord Chancellor and Secretary of State for Justice between July 2019 and September 2021, and Secretary of State for Wales from July 2022. The Seat is also seen as a target seat for Labour, due to how marginal the majority can be.

Members of Parliament

Elections

Elections in the 2010s

Elections in the 2000s

Elections in the 1990s

Neighbouring constituencies

See also
 List of parliamentary constituencies in Wiltshire

Notes

References

Parliamentary constituencies in Wiltshire
Constituencies of the Parliament of the United Kingdom established in 1997
Politics of the Borough of Swindon